Calonarius aureofulvus is a species of fungus in the family Cortinariaceae.

Taxonomy 
It was described by Austrian mycologist Meinhard Michael Moser in 1952 who classified it as Cortinarius aureofulvus and then reclassified it as Phlegmacium aureofulvum in 1960.

In 2022 the species was transferred from Cortinarius and reclassified as Calonarius aureofulvus based on genomic data.

Habitat and distribution 
The species is native to Europe.

References

External links

aureofulvus
Fungi of Europe
Fungi described in 1952
Taxa named by Meinhard Michael Moser